La Bordeta is a neighbourhood in the Sants-Montjuïc district of Barcelona, Catalonia (Spain). It is located between Sants and l'Hospitalet de Llobregat. The neighbourhood was in the bottom of the former municipality of Sants.

External links

 La Bordeta, a la web de l'ajuntament
 La Bordeta map. Sants-Montjuïc district
 Projecte d'intervenció integral. Barri de La Bordeta. April 2017. Barcelona Accions par a l'habitatge. Ajuntament de Barcelona. (Includes maps, pictures and blueprints) 
Comissió de Veïns i Veïnes de la Bordeta 
Memòria BCN. Historical walks through the 20th century Barcelona.

Bordeta, la
Bordeta, la